Lake Parsons is a lake in the state of Kansas. Fishing, camping, picnicking, boating, and a gravel beach swimming area are popular activities.

References

Parsons
Protected areas of Labette County, Kansas
Bodies of water of Labette County, Kansas